Juan Fremiot Torres Oliver (28 October 1925 – 26 January 2012) was the longest-serving  bishop for the Roman Catholic Diocese of Ponce in Ponce, Puerto Rico, with 36 years of service.

Priesthood and episcopacy
Torres Oliver was ordained priest in Ponce at age 24, on 10 April 1950. He was appointed bishop of Ponce on 4 November 1964 at age 39
and was consecrated on 21 December 1964. He retired as bishop of Ponce at age 75, on 10 November 2000, after a 36-year episcopate. He was a bishop emeritus of the diocese of Ponce.

From 1983 to 1994, Torres Oliver was president of the Conferencia Episcopal Puertorriqueña, CEP (Puerto Rican Episcopal Conference).

One of Torres Oliver's most controversial decisions was the one he made in early January 1974. At the death of Isabel la Negra he refused to admit her body into the Ponce Cathedral or to administer her the holy sacraments posthumously.

Legacy
The School of Law at the Pontifical Catholic University of Puerto Rico is named after him.

Death
Torres Oliver died in Ponce on 26 January 2012. His death was the result of a heart attack. His remains will be rest at the Catedral Nuestra Señora de Guadalupe in Ponce.

Episcopal succession

References

Notes

1925 births
2012 deaths
Bishops appointed by Pope Paul VI
Torres Oliver, Juan Fremiot
Clergy from Ponce
People from San Germán, Puerto Rico
Roman Catholic bishops of Ponce